McGraw Machine Hits: 2013-2019 is the fifth greatest hits album by American country music artist Tim McGraw. It was released on November 20, 2020, via Big Machine Records.

Content
The album contains several of McGraw's singles released during his first tenure with Big Machine Records. He left the label in 2019 before re-signing in 2021. Included are the singles "Meanwhile Back at Mama's", "Highway Don't Care", and "Humble and Kind". Also included is his collaboration with Florida Georgia Line, their 2016 single "May We All". Two cover songs are also included. These are of The Cars' "Drive" and The Bellamy Brothers' "Redneck Girl". The latter features guest vocals from the band Midland.

Track listing

Chart performance

References

2019 compilation albums
Tim McGraw albums
Albums produced by Byron Gallimore
albums produced by Tim McGraw
Big Machine Records compilation albums